Ellen Beatriz Griffin Dunne (January 28, 1932 – January 9, 1997) was an American activist. After the death of her daughter, Dominique Dunne, Dunne founded Justice for Homicide Victims. In 1989, she was recognized for her advocacy work by President George H. W. Bush.

Early life and marriage
Griffin was born on January 28, 1932, on Yerba Buena Ranch outside of Tucson, Arizona. Her parents were Thomas Francis Griffin and Beatriz Sandoval Griffin. Thomas Francis Griffin was a wealthy Irish American industrialist part owner and executive of Griffin Wheel Company of Chicago, Illinois. Her mother Beatriz Sandoval was Mexican from Nogales, Sonora.  She attended Miss Porter's School in Farmington, Connecticut, Briarcliff College, and the University of Arizona, the latter where she studied drama.

Griffin met Dominick Dunne in Hartford, Connecticut. They celebrated their marriage in 1954 at Griffin's family ranch in Arizona and lived in New York City before relocating to Beverly Hills. Of their five children, three survived infancy, including Dominique Dunne and Griffin Dunne. The couple divorced in 1965.

Death of Dominique Dunne and founding of Justice for Homicide Victims

The couple's daughter, actor Dominique Dunne, was murdered by ex-boyfriend John Sweeney at her home in October 1982. He strangled her and attempted to kill himself. Actor David Packer, with whom Dunne was rehearsing for the miniseries V, found Sweeney trying to resuscitate Dunne, before attempting to kill himself by overdosing on pills. Sweeney was arrested and Dunne was transported to Cedars-Sinai Medical Center. She was placed on life support immediately and never recovered. She was removed from life support by her parents on November 4, 1982.

On September 21, 1983, Sweeney was acquitted of second-degree murder and instead, he was charged with voluntary manslaughter. Dunne's family protested the verdict as an "injustice."

One year later, Dunne and Marcella Leach founded California Center for Family Survivors of Homicide, a victim's rights group. Now known as Justice for Homicide Victims, the organization supports victims of homicide with legal support and navigation, counseling and referrals, and financial assistance.

In 1989, Dunne was awarded the Crime Victims Award by Dick Thornburgh. Her work was also recognized by then-President George H. W. Bush at the White House.

Later life

Ellen Dunne had multiple sclerosis starting in the early 1980s. In 1990, she left Beverly Hills and relocated to Nogales, where she built a 5,500-square-foot home on the site of her parents' former ranch. She died on January 9, 1997, 19 days before her 65th birthday; a coincidence that is reminiscent of her daughter's death, 19 days prior to her 23rd birthday.

References

Footnotes

Sources

External links
 
 
 Justice for Homicide Victims

1932 births
1997 deaths
20th-century American women
20th-century American people
People from Nogales, Arizona
Miss Porter's School alumni
University of Arizona alumni
Crime victim advocates
Neurological disease deaths in Arizona
Deaths from multiple sclerosis
American people of Irish descent
American people of Mexican descent
American activists of Mexican descent